The 2019–20 UEFA Champions League qualifying phase and play-off round began on 25 June and ended on 28 August 2019.

A total of 53 teams compete in the qualifying system of the 2019–20 UEFA Champions League, which includes the qualifying phase and the play-off round, with 43 teams in Champions Path and 10 teams in League Path. The six winners in the play-off round (four from Champions Path, two from League Path) advanced to the group stage, to join the 26 teams that enter in the group stage.

Times are CEST (UTC+2), as listed by UEFA (local times, if different, are in parentheses).

Teams

Champions Path
The Champions Path includes all league champions which do not qualify directly for the group stage, and consists of the following rounds:
Preliminary round (4 teams playing one-legged semi-finals and final): 4 teams which enter in this round.
First qualifying round (32 teams): 31 teams which enter in this round, and 1 winner of the preliminary round.
Second qualifying round (20 teams): 4 teams which enter in this round, and 16 winners of the first qualifying round.
Third qualifying round (12 teams): 2 teams which enter in this round, and 10 winners of the second qualifying round.
Play-off round (8 teams): 2 teams which enter in this round, and 6 winners of the third qualifying round.

All teams eliminated from the Champions Path enter the Europa League:
The 3 losers of the preliminary round and 15 of the 16 losers of the first qualifying round (excluding 1 team which receives a bye to the third qualifying round as decided by an additional draw held after the Champions League first qualifying round draw) enter the Champions Path second qualifying round.
The loser of the first qualifying round which receives a bye and the 10 losers of the second qualifying round enter the Champions Path third qualifying round.
The 6 losers of the third qualifying round enter the Champions Path play-off round.
The 4 losers of the play-off round enter the group stage.

Below are the participating teams of the Champions Path (with their 2019 UEFA club coefficients), grouped by their starting rounds.

League Path
The League Path includes all league non-champions which do not qualify directly for the group stage, and consists of the following rounds:
Second qualifying round (4 teams): 4 teams which enter in this round.
Third qualifying round (8 teams): 6 teams which enter in this round, and 2 winners of the second qualifying round.
Play-off round (4 teams): 4 winners of the third qualifying round.

All teams eliminated from the League Path enter the Europa League:
The 2 losers of the second qualifying round enter the Main Path third qualifying round.
The 4 losers of the third qualifying round and the 2 losers of the play-off round enter the group stage.

Below are the participating teams of the League Path (with their 2019 UEFA club coefficients), grouped by their starting rounds.

Format
Each tie, apart from the preliminary round, is played over two legs, with each team playing one leg at home. The team that scores more goals on aggregate over the two legs advance to the next round. If the aggregate score is level, the away goals rule is applied, i.e. the team that scores more goals away from home over the two legs advances. If away goals are also equal, then extra time is played. The away goals rule is again applied after extra time, i.e. if there are goals scored during extra time and the aggregate score is still level, the visiting team advances by virtue of more away goals scored. If no goals are scored during extra time, the tie is decided by penalty shoot-out. In the preliminary round, where single-match semi-finals and final are hosted by one of the participating teams, if scores are level at the end of normal time, extra time is played, followed by penalty shoot-out if scores remain tied.

In the draws for each round, teams are seeded based on their UEFA club coefficients at the beginning of the season, with the teams divided into seeded and unseeded pots containing the same number of teams. A seeded team is drawn against an unseeded team, with the order of legs (or the administrative "home" team in the preliminary round matches) in each tie decided by draw. As the identity of the winners of the previous round is not known at the time of the draws, the seeding is carried out under the assumption that the team with the higher coefficient of an undecided tie advances to this round, which means if the team with the lower coefficient is to advance, it simply take the seeding of its opponent. Prior to the draws, UEFA may form "groups" in accordance with the principles set by the Club Competitions Committee, but they are purely for convenience of the draw and do not resemble any real groupings in the sense of the competition. Teams from associations with political conflicts as decided by UEFA may not be drawn into the same tie. After the draws, the order of legs of a tie may be reversed by UEFA due to scheduling or venue conflicts.

Schedule
The schedule is as follows (all draws are held at the UEFA headquarters in Nyon, Switzerland).

Preliminary round

The draw for the preliminary round was held on 11 June 2019, 12:00 CEST, to determine the matchups of the semi-finals and the administrative "home" team of each semi-final and final.

Seeding
A total of four teams were involved in the preliminary round draw. Two teams were seeded and two teams were unseeded for the semi-final round draw.

Bracket

Summary

The semi-final round was played on 25 June, and the final round on 28 June 2019, both at the Fadil Vokrri Stadium in Pristina, Kosovo.

|+Semi-final round

|}

|+Final round

|}

Semi-final round

Final round

First qualifying round

The draw for the first qualifying round was held on 18 June 2019, 14:30 CEST.

Seeding
A total of 32 teams were involved in the first qualifying round draw: 31 teams entering in this round, and the winners of the preliminary round. They were divided into three groups: two groups of ten teams, where five teams were seeded and five teams were unseeded; and one group of twelve teams, where six teams were seeded and six teams were unseeded.

Notes

Summary

The first legs were played on 9 and 10 July, and the second legs on 16 and 17 July 2019.

|}
Notes

Matches

2–2 on aggregate; Nõmme Kalju won on away goals.

Red Star Belgrade won 2–1 on aggregate.

AIK won 4–3 on aggregate.

CFR Cluj won 3–2 on aggregate.

Ferencváros won 5–3 on aggregate.

Qarabağ won 2–0 on aggregate.

2–2 on aggregate; Sutjeska Nikšić won on penalties.

Celtic won 5–2 on aggregate.

Saburtalo Tbilisi won 4–3 on aggregate.

3–3 on aggregate; Valletta won on away goals.

Rosenborg won 6–0 on aggregate.

Maribor won 5–0 on aggregate.

0–0 on aggregate; Dundalk won on penalties.

The New Saints won 3–2 on aggregate.

HJK won 5–2 on aggregate.

BATE Borisov won 3–2 on aggregate.

Second qualifying round

The draw for the second qualifying round was held on 19 June 2019, 12:00 CEST.

Seeding
A total of 24 teams were involved in the second qualifying round draw.
Champions Path: four teams entering in this round, and the 16 winners of the first qualifying round. They were divided into two groups of ten teams, where five teams were seeded and five teams were unseeded.
League Path: four teams entering in this round. Two teams were seeded and two teams were unseeded.

Notes

Summary

The first legs were played on 23 and 24 July, and the second legs on 30 and 31 July 2019.

|+Champions Path

|}

|+League Path

|}

Champions Path

CFR Cluj won 3–2 on aggregate.

Rosenborg won 3–2 on aggregate.

Copenhagen won 3–0 on aggregate.

Ferencváros won 4–2 on aggregate.

Qarabağ won 4–1 on aggregate.

Dinamo Zagreb won 5–0 on aggregate.

Celtic won 7–0 on aggregate.

Red Star Belgrade won 3–2 on aggregate.

APOEL won 4–0 on aggregate.

4–4 on aggregate; Maribor won on away goals.

League Path

Olympiacos won 4–0 on aggregate.

4–4 on aggregate; Basel won on away goals.

Third qualifying round

The draw for the third qualifying round was held on 22 July 2019, 12:00 CEST.

Seeding
A total of 20 teams were involved in the third qualifying round draw.
Champions Path: two teams entering in this round, and the 10 winners of the second qualifying round Champions Path. Six teams were seeded and six teams were unseeded.
League Path: six teams entering in this round, and the two winners of the second qualifying round League Path. Four teams were seeded and four teams were unseeded. Teams from Ukraine and Russia could not be drawn into the same tie, and if such a pairing was drawn or was set to be drawn in the final tie, the second team drawn in the current tie would be moved to the next tie.

Notes

Summary

The first legs were played on 6 and 7 August, and the second legs on 13 August 2019.

|+Champions Path

|}

|+League Path

|}

Champions Path

CFR Cluj won 5–4 on aggregate.

APOEL won 3–2 on aggregate.

Ajax won 5–4 on aggregate.

Dinamo Zagreb won 5–1 on aggregate.

2–2 on aggregate; Red Star Belgrade won on penalties.

Rosenborg won 6–2 on aggregate.

League Path

Olympiacos won 3–0 on aggregate.

3–3 on aggregate; Krasnodar won on away goals.

Club Brugge won 4–3 on aggregate.

LASK won 5–2 on aggregate.

Play-off round

The draw for the play-off round was held on 5 August 2019, 12:00 CEST.

Seeding
A total of 12 teams were involved in the play-off round draw.
Champions Path: two teams entering in this round, and the six winners of the third qualifying round Champions Path. Four teams were seeded and four teams were unseeded.
League Path: the four winners of the third qualifying round League Path. Two teams were seeded and two teams were unseeded.

Notes

Summary

The first legs were played on 20 and 21 August, and the second legs on 27 and 28 August 2019.

|+Champions Path

|}

|+League Path

|}

Champions Path

Dinamo Zagreb won 3–1 on aggregate.

Slavia Prague won 2–0 on aggregate.

3–3 on aggregate; Red Star Belgrade won on away goals. 

Ajax won 2–0 on aggregate.

League Path

Club Brugge won 3–1 on aggregate.

Olympiacos won 6–1 on aggregate.

Top goalscorers
There were 240 goals scored in 91 matches in the qualifying phase and play-off round, for an average of  goals per match.

Notes

References

External links

Qualifying Rounds
2019-20
June 2019 sports events in Europe
July 2019 sports events in Europe
August 2019 sports events in Europe